Spain  competed at the 2017 World Games in Wroclaw, Poland, from July 20, 2017 to July, 30 2017.

Competitors

Beach handball 

The women's team won the bronze medal in the women's tournament.

Finswimming 
Spain has qualified at the 2017 World Games with one female athlete, Silvia Barnés Corominas, who got the pass ending sixth in 50 mt bifins at World Finswimming Championship 2016, held in Volos, Greece.

Gymnastic

Rhythmic Gymnastics
Spain has qualified at the 2017 World Games:

Women's individual event - 1 quota

Trampoline
Argentina has qualified at the 2017 World Games:

Men's Individual Double Mini Trampoline - 1 quota

Karate

Men's Kata - 1 quota (Damián Hugo Quintero Capdevila)
Men's Kumite -60 kg - 1 quota (Matías Gómez García)
Women's Kata - 1 quota (Sandra Sánchez)

Sport Climbing
Spain has qualified at the 2017 World Games:

Men's Lead - Ramon Julian Puigblanque

References 

Nations at the 2017 World Games
2017 in Spanish sport
2017